Goran Vejvoda (Serbian: Горан Вејвода, Goran Vejvoda) (born 1956 in London, United Kingdom) is an English-born, French-based, Serbian media artist (musician, composer, sound and visual artist, performance artist, photographer, writer, and actor).

Early life
Son of the Yugoslav diplomat  who had been a foreign volunteer fighter in the Spanish Civil War as well as prominent Partisan during World War II, Goran was born in London because his father was FPR Yugoslavia's ambassador to United Kingdom at the time. 

In 1960, the family relocated to Rome as his father got reassigned to be the ambassador in Italy. 

In 1967 the family was on the move to Paris where his father got named as the Yugoslav ambassador to France. 

Finally, in 1971 his father got an adviser job at the Yugoslav Foreign Ministry, which meant that 15-year-old Goran came to Belgrade.

Activity
In the early 1980s Vejvoda briefly fronted Annoda Rouge band/project with then-girlfriend Bebi Dol on vocals, Slobodan Trbojevic on bass and Vd on drums. The band never released any official material for commercial exploitation.

Later, Vejvoda collaborated on Bebi Dol's solo hit-singles "Mustafa" and "Rudi" as well as her Ruze i krv album.

Vejvoda also worked on the studio recordings of Kozmetika, D' Boys, and VIS Idoli's seminal Odbrana i poslednji dani album (for a short time during 1982, he was the band's official member). He additionally collaborated with Šarlo akrobata members Koja and Vd on the Dečko koji obećava soundtrack as well as co-producing Elvis J. Kurtović & His Meteors' 1984 debut album Mitovi i legende o kralju Elvisu.

Simultaneously, he wrote for Džuboks and Rock music magazines, doing interviews with the likes of David Byrne, Brian Eno, etc. He published photographs in Izgled magazine and did the cover photos on Paket aranžman album as well as Električni orgazam's self-titled debut album.

With Slobodan Cicmil, Vejvoda co-wrote a book about Brian Eno called Zaobilazne strategije (Oblique strategies) published in 1986. Around the same time, Vejvoda ventured into acting - playing the role of Russian painter El Lissitzky in a TV movie Ruski umetnički eksperiment directed by Boris Miljković and Branimir Dimitrijević.

In 1985 Vejvoda moved to Paris where he continued his visual art, musical studio work, composing music for ballet, theatre, film. television, performing etc.

In 1996 he composed the music for Enki Bilal's film Tykho Moon and the original score for his 2004 film Immortel.

Discography
In The Mooncage with Suba (1986)
Oko 3 (Barclay 1992)
La Peau du Monde (Fairplay 1993)
The Dreambird with Suba (Comep - Brazil - 1994)
Mikroorganizmi with Rambo Amadeus (Komuna 1996)
Tykho Moon (Makhno 1997)
Le sommeil du monstre (Versailles - Sony 1998)
Fruit Cloud (Galerie de Pop Co.,Ltd - Japan - 1999)
Harmonie (Galerie de Pop Co.,Ltd - Japan - 2000)
Zerone - What (Maat 2003)
Immortel (Une musique de film - 2004)
Vibrö - The Broken Tales Issue (2004)
La chute implique d'autres sens with Claudia Huidobro (Limited edition 2007)
A square of silence a circle of sound (Gala Ghenmar - 2007)

References

External links
   Biography on Official Website

Yugoslav musicians
Living people
1956 births
Serbian record producers